Ghotra is a village located in Sujangarh tehsil in the Churu District, Rajasthan, India. As of the 2011 Census of India it had a population of 767.

Babulal jangir  9929107500

References

External links
 Google maps

Churu district